There is a significant  Cuban diaspora in Mexico. Cubans have been a presence in Mexico since the Viceregal era and they have made notable contributions to the culture and politics of the country.

Migration history

Hernán Cortés and his crew of soldiers and sailors used Cuba as a launching point for the conquest of the Aztec Empire. Cuba-born individuals began arriving during the colonial era and have continued into the post-independence era. Many arrived fleeing from the chaos caused by the Cuban War of Independence. Fidel Castro and his followers used Mexico as a launching point for the Cuban Revolution. The majority of modern Cuban migrants have been exiles or refugees fleeing from the Communist regime in Cuba. Both countries share the Spanish language; their historical origins are common (part of the Spanish Empire).

As of 2012, there were 14,637 Cuban-born individuals registered with the Mexican government as living in Mexico. However, the number is likely larger as not all Cubans in the country are legal residents.

The number of registered Cuban residents increased 560% between 2010 and 2016, from 4,033 to 22,604 individuals. During the same period, there was a 710% increase in the Cuban presence in Quintana Roo; a fourth of the population (5,569 individuals) live in that state.

Culture

The danzón arrived with traders and refugees of the Ten Years' War through the ports in Veracruz and Yucatan. While the genre has gone out of style in Cuba, it continues to be popular in Mexico. It reached its peak in popularity in the ballrooms of Mexico City in the 1940s, then went through a decline and afterwards entered a renaissance in the late 20th century. The most famous Mexican danzón piece is Danzón No. 2.

Cuban music also influenced Mexican Cinema, with a genre known as rumberas.

See also
Cuba–Mexico relations
Mexicans in Cuba

References

Further reading

 
Ethnic groups in Mexico
Immigration to Mexico